Eulepidotis delecta is a moth of the family Erebidae first described by William Schaus in 1911. It is found in the Neotropics, including Costa Rica.

References

Moths described in 1911
delecta